Hypertable was an open-source software project to implement a database management system inspired by publications on the design of Google's Bigtable. 

Hypertable runs on top of a distributed file system such as the Apache HDFS, GlusterFS or the CloudStore Kosmos File System (KFS). It is written almost entirely in C++ as the developers believed it had significant performance advantages over Java.

Hypertable software was originally developed at the company Zvents before 2008.
Doug Judd was a promoter of Hypertable.
In January 2009, Baidu, the Chinese language search engine, became a project sponsor.
A version 0.9.2.1 was described in a blog in February, 2009.
Development ended in March, 2016.

Further reading

References

External links 
 
 Google Code page for the project

Bigtable implementations
Free database management systems
Structured storage